At First Sight may refer to:

Prima facie, Latin expression meaning on its first encounter or at first sight
At First Sight (1917 film), 1917 American film
At First Sight (1999 film), 1999 American film
At First Sight (novel), 2005 novel by Nicholas Sparks
At First Sight, Violets Are Blue, 1987 album by The Stems